Brevibacterium linens is a gram-positive, rod-shaped bacterium. It is the type species of the family Brevibacteriaceae.

Brevibacterium linens is ubiquitously present on the human skin, where it causes foot odor. The familiar odor is due to sulfur-containing compounds known as S-methyl thioesters. The same bacterium is also employed to ferment several washed-rind and smear-ripened cheeses such as Munster, Limburger, Tilsit cheese, Port-du-Salut, Raclette, Livarot, Pont l'Eveque, Époisses, Wisconsin Brick, Năsal and Pálpusztai. Its aroma also attracts mosquitoes.

The first comprehensive proteomic reference map of B. linens was published in 2013.

References

External links
Type strain of Brevibacterium linens at BacDive -  the Bacterial Diversity Metadatabase

Bacteria used in dairy products
Bacteria described in 1953
Micrococcales